Sport Benguela e Benfica is an Angolan football club based in Benguela in western Angola, south of Luanda.

In 1943 the team won the Girabola.

Honours
Girabola: 1943

References

External links

Football clubs in Angola
Benguela